1856 in the United States included some significant events that pushed the nation closer towards civil war.

Incumbents

Federal Government 
 President: Franklin Pierce (D-New Hampshire)
 Vice President: vacant
 Chief Justice: Roger B. Taney (Maryland)
 Speaker of the House of Representatives: Nathaniel P. Banks (American-Massachusetts)
 Congress: 34th

Events

January–March
 January 24 – U.S. President Franklin Pierce declares the new Free-State Topeka government in Bleeding Kansas to be in rebellion.
 January 26 – Puget Sound War/Yakima War: Battle of Seattle –  Marines from the USS Decatur drive off American Indian attackers after an all day battle with settlers.
 February – The Tintic War breaks out in Utah.
 February 1 – Auburn University is first chartered as the East Alabama Male College.
 February 2 – Dallas, Texas is incorporated as a city.
 February 12 – American clipper ships Driver and Ocean Queen leave Liverpool and London respectively; both will be lost without trace in the Atlantic, perhaps due to ice, killing 374 and 123 respectively.
 February 18 – The American Party (Know-Nothings) convene in Philadelphia, Pennsylvania to nominate their first Presidential candidate, former President Millard Fillmore.
 March 6 – Maryland Agricultural College (present-day University of Maryland, College Park) is chartered.
 March 9 – National Fraternity Sigma Alpha Epsilon is founded at the University of Alabama in Tuscaloosa, Alabama.
 April 10 – The Theta Chi fraternity is founded at Norwich University.

April–June

 May 16 – The Vigilance Committee is founded in San Francisco, California. It lynches two gangsters, arrests most Democratic Party officials and disbands itself on August 18.
 May 21 – Bleeding Kansas: Lawrence, Kansas is captured and burned by pro-slavery forces (the "Sacking of Lawrence").
 May 22 – Congressman Preston Brooks of South Carolina beats Senator Charles Sumner with a cane in the hall of the United States Senate, for a speech Sumner had made attacking Southerners who sympathized with the pro-slavery violence in Kansas ("Bleeding Kansas"). Sumner is unable to return to duty for 3 years while he recovered; Brooks becomes a hero across the South.
 May 24 – Pottawatomie Massacre: A group of followers of radical abolitionist John Brown kill 5 pro-slavery supporters in Franklin County, Kansas.
 June 2 – Bleeding Kansas – Battle of Black Jack: Anti-slavery forces, led by John Brown, defeat pro-slavery forces.
 June 6 – At the Democratic National Convention, President Franklin Pierce is denied re-nomination for the November presidential election.
 June 9 – 500 Mormons leave Iowa City, Iowa and head west for Salt Lake City, Utah, carrying all their possessions in two-wheeled handcarts.

July–September

 July 17 – The Great Train Wreck of 1856: Two trains collide near Philadelphia, Pennsylvania killing at least 59 and injuring at least 100.
 August 10 – 1856 Last Island hurricane: A hurricane destroys Last Island, Louisiana, leaving at least 200 dead. The whole island is broken up into smaller islands by the storm.
 August 21 – The Charter Oak fell to the ground during a storm
 August 23 – Kate Warne, the first female private detective, begins to work for the Pinkerton Detective Agency.
 August 30
Bleeding Kansas – Battle of Osawatomie: Pro-slavery forces defeat anti-slavery forces.
Chickasaw Constitution signed; establishes new Chickasaw Nation in Indian Territory.
 September 1 – Seton Hall University is founded by Archdiocese of Newark Bishop James Roosevelt Bayley, a cousin of U.S. President Theodore Roosevelt and nephew of Saint Elizabeth Ann Seton.

October–December
 November 4 – U.S. presidential election, 1856: Democrat James Buchanan defeats former President Millard Fillmore, representing a coalition of "Know-Nothings" and Whigs, and John C. Frémont of the fledgling Republican Party, to become the 15th President of the United States.
 November 17 – American Old West: On the Sonoita River in present-day southern Arizona, the United States Army establishes Fort Buchanan in order to help control new land acquired in the Gadsden Purchase.
 November 21 – Niagara University is founded in Niagara Falls, New York.

Ongoing
 Bleeding Kansas (1854–1860)
 Third Seminole War (1855–1858)

Births
 January 7 – Charles Harold Davis, landscape painter (died 1933)
 January 8 – Elizabeth Taylor, painter and traveler (died 1932)
 January 9 – Lizette Woodworth Reese, poet (died 1935)
 January 12 – John Singer Sargent, painter (born in Tuscany; died 1925 in the United Kingdom)
 February 2 – Frederick William Vanderbilt, railroad magnate (died 1938)
 March 20 – Frederick Winslow Taylor, inventor and efficiency expert (died 1915)
 April 5 – Booker T. Washington, educator (died 1915)
 April 23 – Granville T. Woods, African American inventor (died 1910)
 March 8 – Colin Campbell Cooper, impressionist painter (died 1937)
 May 6 – Robert Peary, Arctic explorer (died 1920)
 May 15 – L. Frank Baum, children's writer (The Wizard of Oz) (died 1919)
 May 26 – George Templeton Strong, composer (died 1948 in Switzerland)
 July 9/10 – Nikola Tesla inventor, genius (died in 1947 in New York, United States) 
 July 11 – Georgiana Drew, stage actress (died 1893)
 July 24 – Franklin Ware Mann, inventor (died 1916)
 July 25 – Charles Major, novelist and lawyer (died 1913)
 August 15 – Charles E. Townsend, U.S. Senator from Michigan from 1911 to 1923 (died 1924)
 September 3 –Louis Sullivan, architect, "father of skyscrapers" (died 1924)
 September 5
 William B. McKinley, U.S. Senator from Illinois from 1921 to 1926 (died 1926)
 Thomas E. Watson, U.S. Senator from Georgia from 1921 to 1922 (died 1922)
 September 9 – Richard R. Kenney, U.S. Senator from Delaware from 1897 to 1901 (died 1931)
 October 7 – Moses Fleetwood Walker, baseball pitcher and Black nationalist (died 1924)
 October 10 – George McClellan, U.S. Representative from New York (died 1927)
 October 28 – Anna Elizabeth Klumpke, portrait and genre painter (died 1942)
 October 30 – Charles Leroux, balloonist and parachutist (died 1889)
 November 6 – Jefferson David Chalfant, trompe-l'œil painter (died 1931)
 November 13 – Louis Brandeis, U.S. Supreme Court Justice (died 1941)
 November 14 – Madeleine Lemoyne Ellicott, suffragette (died 1945)
 November 16 – Carrie Babcock Sherman, wife of James S. Sherman, Second Lady of the United States (died 1931)
 November 17 – Thomas Taggart, U.S. Senator from Indiana in 1916 (died 1929)
 November 21 – William Emerson Ritter, biologist (died 1944)
 November 22 – Heber J. Grant, seventh president of the Church of Jesus Christ of Latter-day Saints (died 1945)
 December 22 – Frank B. Kellogg, U.S. Senator from Minnesota from 1917 to 1923 (died 1937)
 December 23 – James Buchanan Duke, tobacco and electric power industrialist (born 1925)
 December 28 
 Woodrow Wilson, 28th President of the United States from 1913 to 1921 (died 1924)
 Sarah Platt-Decker, née Chase, suffragist (died 1912)

Deaths
 January 1 – John M. Berrien, U.S. Senator from Georgia from 1841 to 1852 (born 1781)
 January 16 –Thaddeus William Harris, naturalist (born 1795)
 April 19 – Thomas Rogers, railroad locomotive builder (born 1792)
 April 20 – Robert L. Stevens, president of Camden and Amboy Railroad (born 1787)
 April 26 – George Troup, U.S. Senator from Georgia from 1816 to 1818 and 1829 to 1833 (born 1780)
 May 5 – William Crosby Dawson, U.S. Senator from Georgia from 1849 to 1855 (born 1798)
 May 31 – John Milton Niles, U.S. Senator from Connecticut from 1835 to 1839 and 1843 to 1849 (born 1787)
 July 9  
 Alfred Cuthbert, U.S. Senator from Georgia from 1835 to 1843 (born 1785)
 James Strang, Mormon splinter group leader (born 1813)
 September 7 – Almon W. Babbitt, Mormon pioneer and first secretary/treasurer of Utah Territory (born 1812)
 October 19 – William Sprague III, politician from Rhode Island (born 1799)
 November 9 – John M. Clayton, U.S. Senator from Delaware from 1829 to 1836, 1845 to 1849 and 1853 to 1856 (born 1796)

See also
Timeline of United States history (1820–1859)

References

External links
 

 
1850s in the United States
United States
United States
Years of the 19th century in the United States